The 1947 Kentucky gubernatorial election was held on November 4, 1947. Democratic nominee Earle Clements defeated Republican nominee Eldon S. Dummit with 57.24% of the vote.

Primary elections
Primary elections were held on August 2, 1947.

Democratic primary

Candidates
Earle Clements, U.S. Representative
Harry Lee Waterfield, State Representative
R. E. Lee Murphy

Results

Republican primary

Candidates
Eldon S. Dummit, Attorney General of Kentucky
John F. Williams
Jesse W. Knox

Results

General election

Candidates
Major party candidates
Earle Clements, Democratic
Eldon S. Dummit, Republican

Other candidates
W. A. Sandefur, Socialist

Results

References

1947
Kentucky
Gubernatorial
November 1947 events in the United States